Aviva Balas is an Israeli athlete. She won the silver medal in the 400 m in the 1970 Asian Games. At the 1973 Maccabiah Games, she won the gold medal in the women's 400 m race.

References

Asian Games medalists in athletics (track and field)
Athletes (track and field) at the 1970 Asian Games
Asian Games silver medalists for Israel
Medalists at the 1970 Asian Games
Israeli female sprinters
Jewish female athletes (track and field)
Maccabiah Games gold medalists for Israel
Maccabiah Games medalists in athletics
Competitors at the 1973 Maccabiah Games